The 2021–22 season was Hereford's seventh season since forming as a phoenix club after the demise of Hereford United in 2014. The club competed in the National League North for the fourth consecutive season following their 12th placed finish in the previous season.

First-team squad 
 As of 7 May 2022

Transfers

Transfers in

Transfers out

Loans in

Loans out

Pre-season

Competitions

Overview

National League North

League table

Results summary

Matches

FA Cup 

Hereford entered the competition in the second qualifying round.

FA Trophy 

Hereford entered the competition in the second round.

HFA County Challenge Cup

Squad statistics

Goals

Club awards

End-of-season awards

References 

Hereford F.C.